Yi Kang, Prince Imperial Ui (Korean: 의친왕 이강, 30 March 1877－15 August 1955), also known as Prince Uihwa, was the second son of Emperor Gojong of Korea and his concubine, Lady Jang, who was a court lady-in-waiting.

It was not until 1892 when he was recognized as a legitimate prince with the name of Yi Kang, and was titled Prince Uihwa with the style of Royal Highness, following a decree issued by his father. He married Lady Kim Sudeok, a daughter of an official in court, Kim Sajun. Prince Yi Kang was not the Crown Prince, even though he was older than his half-brother Prince Imperial Yeong, due to various reasons including the status of his mother.

Biography

Education and early life
There are not many official records about his early life, which may be caused by being born by Lady Jang, a court lady-in-waiting of King Gojong but not the king's official consort or concubine during her lifetime. Lady Jang came from the Deoksu Jang clan, and Queen Inseon (Hyojong of Joseon's queen consort) was her distant relative. According to the tradition, the half-brothers of the crown prince, in this case, Yi Cheok (future Sunjong of Korea), needed to move out from the palace until the latter reached the age 10; as the result, there were some years that Yi Kang lives with Pak Yung-hio, the son-in-law of King Cheoljong. During the Gapsin Coup in 1884, Yi Kang and his mother were taken by Pak Yung-hio to the palace; contemporary rumors claimed that the coup d'état tried to replace the king with Yi Kang; but after the coup ended, Yi left the palace again. During his young age, Yi Kang grew up with a bad reputation because of his behavior.

Later, Queen Min, Gojong's wife, asked her husband to grant Yi Kang a title, so Yi Kang became Prince Uihwa (의화군) in 1892. After three rounds of choosing in 1893, the daughter of an official Kim Sa-jun, Lady Kim (Kim Sudeok), was chosen to be the spouse of Yi Kang, which was arranged by Queen Min. Lady Kim, also known as "Lady Kim of Deokindang", was a distant relative to Queen Inmok, the queen consort of Seonjo of Joseon in the early 17th century; Yi Kang never had an issue with his wife. Even after getting married, Yi Kang got involved into deft and lawsuit problems.

Prince Yi Kang was appointed special ambassador to the Empire of Japan for the celebration ceremonies for Japan's victory in the First Sino-Japanese War of 1894-1895. According to Yun Chi-ho, who met Yi before going Europe, assessed him as a smart 18 years old who had a good personality like his father but worried to study abroad. In August 1895, Yi was appointed as Special ambassador and visited some European countries including, the United Kingdom, Germany, France, Russia, Italy and Austria-Hungary. In 1899, he in Japan. According to Japanese record, 3,000 Won was sent for Yi. While he was not in Korea, Yi Kang was promoted to the rank of Prince Imperial Ui, and styled His Imperial Highness in 1900. At the same year, he went to the United States and began studies at Roanoke College in Salem, Virginia from March 1901, where he majored in mathematics. While he was in the United States, the Korean Government gave him 30,000 Won in 1902. While in America, Yi was beaten by some Americans in 1903. In 1904, some Korean foreign students tried to abdicate Gojong and make Yi the emperor. After graduation, he spent a brief period at the Ohio Wesleyan University in Delaware, Ohio, and then traveled to San Francisco and Hawaii, returning to Korea on 15 March 1906. Same year, he got Order of the Golden Ruler. On 8 April 1906, Yi was appointed as Lieutenant General (부장). He was appointed as Chanmogwan and was ordered to participated in the Military parade in Empire of Japan. He received 1st class of Order of the Paulownia Flowers from the Japanese Government while he was in Japan.

Prince Yi Kang served as the president of the Korean Red Cross from 1906 to 1907. On 15 January 1907, Yi persuaded civilians and military personnels to raise Righteous army. When Emperor Gojong was abdicated and Emperor Sunjong succeeded as the Emperor, Yi was not appointed as the crown prince, but his younger brother, Yi Un, was appointed as the crown prince because, Yi did not receive public support and Gojong did not like him. Also, Imperial Consort Sunheon bribed Itō Hirobumi, who was the Japanese Resident General of Korea, to appoint her son as the crown prince. When Itō Hirobumi was assassinated by An Jung-geun, Yi was ordered to participate the funeral as deputy of Korean Imperial House. But the order was canceled and Minister of Imperial Household Min Byeong-seok was sent instead.

Under Japanese rule

Following the abdication of Emperor Gojong in 1907, and the Japan-Korea Treaty of 1910 by which Korea was annexed to the Empire of Japan, Prince Yi Kang grew increasingly dissatisfied with his status, even though the Japanese provided him with a huge annual allowance. At the same time, the title "Prince Imperial Ui" was abolished and he was known as the "Duke Yi Kang", a title given by Japanese.

During the March 1st Movement, Yi participated as one of the representatives of Korea. Since Yi used to study abroad and know much about the world, the Provisional Government of the Republic of Korea wanted Yi to join the government. After the escape of Gim Ga-jin, an Imperial Korean official before, the Provisional Government's objective was Yi's refuge to Shanghai. On 9 November 1919, he collaborated with Choe Ik-hwan, a member of Daedongdan, who attempted to support him as the new leader of Korea. Prince Yi Kang then tried to escape to the Provisional Government of Korea based in Shanghai, only to be discovered in Dandong from Manchuria and returned to his home country. Lee Jong-Wook got orders from Ahn Changho to accompany Yi and help escape of Yi. With the help of Cheon Un-boek, who was an employee of the Japanese General Government Building, Yi successfully met Lee Jong-Wook, who came to rescue him. Yi faked his face by attaching mustaches on his face. However, Yi was caught near the Dandong Station, which is located in Zhenxing District. On 13 November 1919, Yi was sent back to Kyeongseong by Japanese police force. After this, the Japanese government claimed that Yi Kang was "abducted" and "wanted to escape to live profligately again". Later, Yi Kang asked to deprive his title multiple times but he wasn't approved. Yi's home became part of Deoksugung.

On 20 November 1919, Yi had an interview with Tongnip Sinmun. He said that he would rather be a peasant of the independent Korea than a noble of Empire of Japan. During the reign of Saitō Makoto, Saitō met Yi many times and tried to change his stance about the independence. As of November 10, 1925, a law for defining the status of the former Korean imperial family was made; on June 12, 1930, Yi Kang officially retired and his eldest son Yi Geon succeeded him as duke, but Yi Kang's styles and allowances still remained until the end of World War II.

Throughout the Japanese rule, there were only few members of Yi Kang family recognized by Japan: Yi Kang himself, his wife Kim Sudeok (Duchess Consort of Yi Kang), his eldest son Duke Yi Geon with his family, and his second son Duke Yi U (adopted as the heir to Duke Yi Jun-yong in 1917) with his family.

After Independence 
After the independence of Korea, he continued to live in Seoul, but in increasing poverty. On 9 August 1955 he was baptized a Roman Catholic, given the Christian name "Pius"; Lady Kim was also baptized and had a name "Maria". Yi said that the reason why he was baptized a Roman Catholic was to apologize the Anti-Catholic of Joseon led by Heungseon Daewongun. Yi Kang died a week later on August 15, 1955, at the age of 78, in his mansion "Seongrakwon" Manor (now Seongnagwon Garden, in Seongbuk District, Seoul); he was buried at the Hongneung and Yureung imperial tombs in Namyangju near Seoul, where his father and brothers are also buried. His official heritor was decided to be his third son, Yi Bang on 30 June 1970.

Family
Prince Yi Gang married Kim Sudeok (22 December 1880 — 14 January 1964) in 1892; however, the couple had no children. Therefore, all children Yi Gang had, 12 sons and 9 daughters, were born by 13 of his various concubines.

Wife

Concubines

Sons

Daughters

Ancestry

Honours 

 Order of the Golden Ruler on 9 April 1906

 Order of the Paulownia Flowers 1st class on 27 April 1906
 Korean Colonization Decoration on 1 August 1912
 Grand Cordon of the Order of the Rising Sun

Notes

Further reading

References

1877 births
1955 deaths
House of Yi
Korean independence activists
Kazoku
Korean princes
Keio University alumni
Roanoke College alumni
South Korean Roman Catholics
Recipients of the Order of the Rising Sun with Paulownia Flowers
Lieutenant generals of Korean Empire
Sons of emperors
Politicians of the Korean Empire
Converts to Roman Catholicism
People from Seoul